This is a timeline of the development of plastics, comprising key discoveries and developments in the production of plastics.

Pre 19th Century

19th Century

20th Century

References

Plastics
Chemistry